Kevin Verdugo (born September 16, 1968) is an American football coach and former player. Verdugo was most recently the head football coach at Fort Hays State University from 2005 to 2010.

Coaching career

Fort Scott Community College
Verdugo was the head coach at Fort Scott, where he was named the 2001 Kansas Jayhawk Conference Coach of the Year.

Fort Hays State
After Fort Scott, Verdugo was named the head coach for the Fort Hays Tigers located in Hays, Kansas. He has held that position from 2005 to the end of the 2010 season and was the 22nd football coach at the school. His career coaching record at Fort Hays was 18 wins and 47 losses.

After the end of the 2010 season when the team produced a record of 3–8, it was announced that he would not return for the 2011 season.

Head coaching record

College

References

1968 births
Living people
Akron Zips football coaches
Colorado State Rams football players
Fort Hays State Tigers football coaches
Fort Scott Greyhounds football coaches
Kansas Jayhawks football players
Northern Michigan Wildcats football coaches
Southeast Missouri State Redhawks football coaches
Southern Illinois Salukis football coaches